Dennis To Yu-hang (born 1 January 1981) is a Hong Kong martial artist and actor. He started his career as a wushu practitioner and won several awards at various competitions, including a silver medal at the 2002 Asian Games and a gold medal at the 2005 East Asian Games. He became an actor in 2007 and started by playing minor roles in Ip Man (2008), Bodyguards and Assassins (2009) and Ip Man 2 (2010). He is best known for his role as the Wing Chun grandmaster Ip Man in the 2010 film The Legend Is Born – Ip Man.

Career
To started practising wushu at the age of six in the Hong Kong Wushu Union's classes. He attended Helen Liang Memorial Secondary School in Sha Tin, Hong Kong. After graduating from school, To joined the Hong Kong Wushu Team and started participating in wushu competitions. In 1999, at the age of 18, To won a gold medal in Changquan at the 1999 World Wushu Championships, becoming the youngest wushu champion in Hong Kong. He also won various medals at the 2001 and 2003 World Wushu Championships. In 2002, he won a silver medal in Changquan at the 2002 Asian Games. In 2005, To, together with Chan Siu-kit and Chow Ting-yu, won a gold medal in duilian at the East Asian Games.

To took part in the Hong Kong leg of the 2008 Summer Olympics torch relay as one of the 120 torchbearers in Hong Kong.

To joined the entertainment industry in 2007. He is an artiste under National Arts Holdings Limited. To made his debut in a minor role in the 2008 film Ip Man, directed by Wilson Yip and starring Donnie Yen, and he also appeared in the sequel Ip Man 2 (2010). Later, in 2010, he was cast as the lead character, Wing Chun grandmaster Ip Man, in the 2010 film The Legend Is Born – Ip Man.

Filmography

Awards and nominations

Wushu

Film

References

External links
 
 

1981 births
Living people
Hong Kong male film actors
Wing Chun practitioners from Hong Kong
Hong Kong wushu practitioners
Asian Games medalists in wushu
Wushu practitioners at the 2002 Asian Games
Wushu practitioners at the 2006 Asian Games
Asian Games silver medalists for Hong Kong
Medalists at the 2002 Asian Games